Cicerina elegans is a species of flatworms in the class Rhabditophora. It is an interstitial species from the bay of Great Peter of the Sea of Japan.

References

External links 

 Cicerina elegans at the World Register of marine Species (WoRMS)

Rhabditophora
Animals described in 1971
Sea of Japan